Minskaya (Russian: Минская) is a station of the Kalininsko-Solntsevskaya Line of the Moscow Metro between Lomonosovsky Prospekt and Park Pobedy. The station was opened on 16 March 2017 as a part of the stretch between Park Pobedy and Ramenki.

References

Moscow Metro stations
Kalininsko-Solntsevskaya line
Railway stations in Russia opened in 2017
Railway stations located underground in Russia